Carl Edwards (born August 15, 1979) is an American former professional racing driver.

Carl Edwards may also refer to:
 Carl Johannes Edwards (1914–1985), British stained glass artist
 Carl Edwards (equestrian) (born 1963), British equestrian
 Carl Edwards Jr. (born 1991), American baseball player